Her Beloved Villain is a lost 1920 American comedy film directed by Sam Wood and written by Alice Eyton. The film stars Wanda Hawley, Ramsey Wallace, Templar Powell, Tully Marshall, Lillian Leighton and Gertrude Claire. The film was released on December 10, 1920, by Realart Pictures Corporation.

Cast         
Wanda Hawley as Suzanne Bergamot
Ramsey Wallace as Paul Blythe
Templar Powell as Louis Martinot 
Tully Marshall as Dr. Joseph Poulard
Lillian Leighton as Madame Poulard
Gertrude Claire as Susanne's Aunt
Robert Bolder as Monsieur Bergomat
Margaret McWade as Madame Bergomat
Harrison Ford as Martinot
Irma Coonly as Rose 
Jay Peters as Casimer

References

External links
 

1920 films
1920s English-language films
Silent American comedy films
1920 comedy films
Films directed by Sam Wood
Lost American films
American silent feature films
American films based on plays
American black-and-white films
1920 lost films
Lost comedy films
1920s American films